Sidney Wyman  (June 1, 1910 – June 1978 in St. Louis, Missouri) was a poker player and hotel owner in Las Vegas, Nevada.

Biography
Born to a Jewish family, Wyman was a gambler and co-owner of several Las Vegas casinos including the Sands, Riviera, Royal Nevada, and The Dunes. In 1979, Wyman was made a charter member of the Poker Hall of Fame.

Wyman died on June 26, 1978, of cancer at Cedars Sinai Medical Center in Los Angeles. He never married but had a long time girl friend. He was buried at Hillside Memorial Park.

References

1910 births
1978 deaths
American poker players
20th-century American Jews
American casino industry businesspeople
20th-century American businesspeople
Poker Hall of Fame inductees